Game One is a French television channel owned by Paramount Networks EMEAA. The channel shows several programs based on video gaming. It also airs Japanese anime on a regular basis, such as Fairy Tail, Naruto, Naruto: Shippuden, Dragon Ball, Dragon Ball Z, Dragon Ball Z Kai and Eyeshield 21.

In Germany between 2006 and 2014, a television show about videos games with the same name aired on MTV Germany. After the show was cancelled, the guys from Game One launched an online TV channel with the name Rocket Beans TV on Twitch and YouTube. Since 2016, they moderate the web show Game Two with the support of FUNK, an online service of the German television channels Das Erste and ZDF.

References

External links 
Official website

Paramount International Networks
Television stations in France
Television channels and stations established in 1998
1998 establishments in France
Video game culture
Video game journalism
Anime television
Cinema chains in France